Major Sir Henry Lancelot Aubrey-Fletcher, 6th Baronet   (10 September 1887 – 30 May 1969), also known by his pen name Henry Wade, was Lord Lieutenant of Buckinghamshire from 1954 to 1961. He was also one of the leading authors during the Golden Age of Detective Fiction.

Life 
Aubrey-Fletcher was the only son and second child of Sir Lancelot Aubrey-Fletcher, 5th Baronet and Emily Harriet Wade (married 18 April 1882 St Anne, Soho, London), though his father had already had another son by a previous marriage, but the child died in infancy. He was educated at Eton College and New College, Oxford.

He fought in both the First World War and Second World War with the Grenadier Guards, being awarded the Distinguished Service Order and French Croix de guerre in 1917. He was a member of Buckinghamshire County Council and appointed High Sheriff of Buckinghamshire in 1925. He played Minor counties cricket between 1921 and 1928 for Buckinghamshire.

He was also, under the pen name of Henry Wade, a noted mystery writer and one of the founding members of the Detection Club.

He married Mary Augusta Chilton  in 1911 and with her had 5 children:
John Henry Lancelot Aubrey-Fletcher (1912–1992)
Nigel Chilton Aubrey-Fletcher (1914–1980)
Lancelot Philip Aubrey-Fletcher (1919–2000)
Mary Elizabeth Aubrey-Fletcher (1923–1994)
Edward Henry Lancelot Aubrey-Fletcher, born 6 May 1930

After the death of his wife in 1963, he married Nancy Cecil Bull in 1965. Sir Henry died on 30 May 1969, aged 81. His estate was valued at £108 537.

Detective and mystery books
List of works published by "Henry Wade".

Inspector Poole novels 
 The Duke of York's Steps, 1929
 No Friendly Drop, 1931
 Constable Guard Thyself, 1934
 Bury Him Darkly, 1936
 Lonely Magdalen, 1940
 Too Soon to Die, 1953
 Gold Was Our Grave, 1954

Other novels 
 The Verdict of You All, 1926
 The Missing Partners 1928
 The Dying Alderman, 1930
 The Hanging Captain, 1932
 Mist on the Saltings, 1933
 Heir Presumptive, 1935
 The High Sheriff, 1937
 Released for Death, 1938
 Harvey in Scotland, 1938  
 New Graves at Great Norne, 1947
 Diplomat’s Folly, 1951
 Be Kind to the Killer, 1952
 A Dying Fall, 1955
 The Litmore Snatch, 1957

Short Stories 
Policeman's Lot, 1933
 "Duello" (Inspector Poole story)
 "The Missing Undergraduate" (Inspector Poole story)
 "Wind in the East" (Inspector Poole story)
 "The Sub-Branch" (Inspector Poole story)
 "The Real Thing" (Inspector Poole story)
 "The Baronet's Finger" (Inspector Poole story)
 "The Three Keys" (Inspector Poole story)
 "A Matter of Luck"
 "Four to One - Bar One"
 "Payment in Full"
 "Jealous Gun"
 "The Amateurs"
 "The Tenth Round"

Here Comes the Copper, 1938
 "These Artists!"
 "The Seagull"
 "The Ham Sandwich"
 "Summer Meeting"
 "Anti-Tank"
 "A Puff of Smoke"
 "Steam Coal"
 "Toll of the Road"
 "November Night"
 "The Little Sportsman"
 "Lodgers"
 "One Good Turn"
 "Smash and Grab"

Other Stories
 "Cotton Wool and Cutlets" (20 Story Magazine May 1940 - Sergeant Bragg story)

References

External links
 

Biography
The Realist School of Detective Fiction
Review of his Henry Wade book Constable Guard Thyself by British crime writer Martin Edwards

1887 births
1969 deaths
Military personnel from Surrey
Alumni of New College, Oxford
Baronets in the Baronetage of Great Britain
British Army personnel of World War I
British Army personnel of World War II
British crime writers
Buckinghamshire cricketers
Commanders of the Royal Victorian Order
Companions of the Distinguished Service Order
English cricketers
Grenadier Guards officers
High Sheriffs of Buckinghamshire
Knights of the Order of St John
Members of Buckinghamshire County Council
Members of the Detection Club
Lord-Lieutenants of Buckinghamshire
People educated at Eton College
People from Buckinghamshire
Recipients of the Croix de Guerre 1914–1918 (France)